Dark Red is a shade of maroon.

Dark Red may also refer to:
 Dark Red (album), by Shlohmo, 2015
 "Dark Red", a 2017 song by Steve Lacy from the EP Steve Lacy's Demo
 The Dark Red, a 2018 American independent mystery thriller film

See also